Lobilema is a genus of moths in the subfamily Arctiinae. It contains the single species Lobilema conspersa, which is found in Tanzania.

References

Natural History Museum Lepidoptera generic names catalog

Endemic fauna of Tanzania
Lithosiini